The Uropyxidaceae are a family of rust fungi in the order Pucciniales. The family contains 15 genera and 149 species.

Genera
Dasyspora
Didymopsorella
Dipyxis
Kimuromyces
Leucotelium
Macruropyxis
Mimema
Ochropsora
Phragmopyxis
Poliomopsis
Porotenus
Prospodium
Sorataea
Tranzschelia
Uropyxis

References

External links

Pucciniales
Basidiomycota families